Bieler Tagblatt is a Swiss Standard German language daily newspaper, published by Gassmann AG in Biel/Bienne, Canton of Bern.

History and operations 
It was established in 1850 under the name Seeländer Bote. Gassmann AG, the publisher of the paper, also publishes the French-language newspaper Journal du Jura.

The newspaper's estimated readership in 2013 was 54,000 according to WEMF AG.

See also 
 List of newspapers in Switzerland

References

External links 
 Official website
 

1850 establishments in Switzerland

Mass media in Biel/Bienne
Daily newspapers published in Switzerland
German-language newspapers published in Switzerland
Publications established in 1850